In cricket, a five-wicket haul (also known as a "five–for" or "fifer") refers to a bowler taking five or more wickets in a single innings. This is regarded as a notable achievement. To date, 159 cricketers have taken a five-wicket haul on debut in a Test match, with 33 of them being taken by Australian cricketers.

Key

|}

References

Australian
Australia